Konekan is a village in the Wundwin Township, Mandalay Region of  central  Myanmar.

References

Populated places in Mandalay District